Përpjekja (meaning Endeavor in English) is an Albanian language quarterly culture and literary magazine published in Tirana, Albania.

History and profile
Përpjekja was first published in 1994. Its founder is Fatos Lubonja. He is also editor of the magazine, which is published by Perpjekja Center on a quarterly basis in Tirana.

Bashkim Shehu, Edi Rama, Ardian Klosi, and Shkëlzen Maliqi are frequent contributors to Përpjekja. The magazine publishes short stories, poems and writings about literary and cultural criticism. The quarterly also features articles on critical evaluations about political developments in the country and about the views of contemporary philosophers and intellectuals such as Jürgen Habermas, George Steiner and Adam Michnik.

See also
 List of magazines in Albania

References

1994 establishments in Albania
Albanian-language magazines
Cultural magazines
Literary magazines published in Albania
Magazines established in 1994
Mass media in Tirana
Quarterly magazines